The Mystery at the Ski Jump is the twenty-ninth volume in the Nancy Drew Mystery Stories series. It was first published in 1952 under the pseudonym Carolyn Keene. The actual author was ghostwriter Alma Sasse.

Plot 
Nancy, Bess, and George follow the trail of fur thieves to New York and into Canada. While trying to catch the thieves, Nancy must catch a woman named Mitzi Channing who is using Nancy's identity.  Nancy finds out that everyone who has been buying from Mitzi is in a dreadful trap.

External links
 

1952 American novels
1952 children's books
Grosset & Dunlap books
Nancy Drew books
Children's mystery novels